Joonas Vihko (born April 6, 1981) is a Finnish former professional ice hockey winger.

Vihko began his career with Kiekko-Vantaa before moving to his hometown team HIFK in 1998.  Having played in U18 and U20 level he eventually made his way up to the senior team.  In 2004-05 he was loaned out to HC Salamat and in 2005-06 he moved to SaiPa for a brief tenure.  He then signed with HPK and after four seasons he moved to Sweden to sign for Luleå HF.

Vihko was drafted 103rd overall in the 2002 NHL Entry Draft by the Mighty Ducks of Anaheim but never signed a contract and remained in Finland.  He has represented Finland at U20 level.

Career statistics

References

External links

1981 births
Finnish ice hockey left wingers
HC Salamat players
HIFK (ice hockey) players
HPK players
Ilves players
Anaheim Ducks draft picks
Living people
Luleå HF players
SaiPa players
EC Bad Tölz players
Vaasan Sport players
Ice hockey people from Helsinki